ITV aired Sexton Blake starring Laurence Payne as Sexton Blake and Roger Foss as Tinker from Monday 25 September 1967 to Wednesday 13 January 1971.

Plot
In keeping with Sexton Blake's classic print adventures, Payne's Blake drove a white Rolls-Royce named "The Grey Panther" and owned a bloodhound named Pedro.

Typical of the TV show's sometimes-fantastic storylines (all of which lasted 2–6 episodes) was 1968's "The Invicta Ray" in which a villain dressed in a costume and hood of sackcloth-like material and, under the Invicta Ray, became invisible so that he could commit crimes without being seen.

Cast
 Laurence Payne as  Sexton Blake 
 Roger Foss as  Edward Clark 'Tinker' 
 Dorothea Phillips as  Mrs. Bardell 
 Meredith Edwards as  Inspector 'Taff' Evans 
 Elizabeth Bell as  Julia Mangini  
 Edward Jewesbury as  Dr. John Mangini
 Philippa Gail as  Carole Vane
 Charles Morgan as Inspector Davies
 Eric Lander as Inspector Cardfish

Production

Development
The show was originally produced by Ronald Marriott for Rediffusion, with Thames Television taking over production in 1968.

Pedro was played by one or more bloodhounds (bitches), which doubled as 'Henry', for Chunky dog food adverts with Clement Freud, and were owned by the then secretary of the Bloodhound Club, Mrs Bobbie Edwards.

During rehearsals for the show in 1968, Laurence Payne was blinded in his left eye by a rapier.

Episodes

Season 1
 The Find-The-Lady Affair. 4 episodes. Monday 25 September 1967 to Monday 16 October 1967.
 Knave of Diamonds. 5 episodes. Monday 23 October 1967 to Monday 20 November.
 The Great Tong Mystery. 4 episodes. Monday 27 November 1967 to Monday 18 December 1967.
 The Vanishing Snowman. Christmas Special. Monday 25 December 1967.
 House of Masks. 4 episodes. Monday 1 January 1968 to Monday 22 January 1968.
 The Invicta Ray. 4 episodes. Monday 29 January 1968 to Monday 19 February 1968.

Season 2
 The Case of the Gasping Goldfish. 2 episodes. Thursday 14 November 1968 to Thursday 21 November 1968.
 Return of the Scorpion. 2 episodes. Thursday 28 November 1968 to Thursday 5 December 1968.
 The Great Train Robbery. 2 episodes. Thurs 16 January 1969 to Thurs 23 January 1969.
 The Great Soccer Mystery. 3 episodes. Thurs 30 January 1969 to Thurs 13 Feb 1969.

Season 3
 Sexton Blake and Captain Nemesis. 3 episodes. Wed 8 Oct 1969 to Wed 22 Oct 1969.
 Sexton Blake versus The Gangsters. 3 episodes. Wed 29 Oct 1969 to Wed 12 Nov 1969.
 Sexton Blake and the Frightened Man. 2 eps. Wed 19 Nov 1969 to Wed 26 Nov 1969.
 Sexton Blake and the Undertaker. 3 episodes. Wed 3 Dec 1969 to Wed 17 Dec 1969.
 Sexton Blake and the Toy Family. 2 episodes. Wed 23 Dec 1969 to Wed 30 Dec 1969.

Season 4
 Sexton Blake and the Puff Adder. 6 episodes. Wed 9 Dec 1970 to Wed 13 January 1971.

Release

Availability
Of 50 episodes, only the first episode is thought to still exist. This is available to watch on YouTube.

References

External links

Opening three minutes of the pilot episode of the 1967 Sexton Blake TV show: The Find-The-Lady Affair

1960s British crime television series
1970s British crime television series
ITV television dramas
1967 British television series debuts
1971 British television series endings
Television shows produced by Associated-Rediffusion
Television shows produced by Thames Television
English-language television shows
Sexton Blake